Calytrix habrantha is a species of plant in the myrtle family Myrtaceae that is endemic to Western Australia.

It usually blooms between November and January producing pink to purple flowers.

Found on undulating plains with a scattered distribution through the Wheatbelt region of Western Australia  where it grows on sand or loam soils with gravel and laterite.

The species was first formally described by the botanist Lyndley Craven in 1987 in the article A taxonomic revision of Calytrix Labill. (Myrtaceae) in the journal Brunonia.

References

Plants described in 1987
habrantha
Flora of Western Australia